Samuel Pérez may refer to:
Samuel Pérez (pianist) (born 1952), Puerto Rican pianist
Samuel Perez Jr. (born 1958), American admiral
Samu Pérez or Samuel Pérez Fariña (born 1997), Spanish footballer